Poso (Old Spelling: Posso) is the administrative capital of Poso Regency, Indonesia. It is the main port and transportation hub for the central-southern coast of Central Sulawesi. Its urban area consists of three districts, Poso Kota, North Poso Kota, and South Poso Kota. Poso lies in the middle of the province on the shore of the Gulf of Tomini, right in the central part of Sulawesi island. With a total population of 47,477 in 2020, it is one of the biggest and the oldest towns in the province.

Poso began to develop as a small port town located at the mouth of the Poso River at the end of the 19th century—making it one of the oldest towns in Central Sulawesi, and its presence was considered important for the Dutch to control the southern region of Tomini in the early days of their arrival. Poso was the administrative center of Landschap Poso, Onderafdeling Poso, and later Afdeling Poso during colonial times. In the midst of the World War II, the Japanese made Poso one of their military posts. Post-independence, Poso was chosen as the capital of the newly formed Central Sulawesi in 1948 before the capital was moved to Palu in 1951.

The central location of Poso has made it a stopover either from the north to the south, or from west to the east of Sulawesi. It is for this reason that the population of Poso consists of many different ethnicities, religions and backgrounds. People living in Poso are spread from the coastal area to the mountainous region, with the main sources of income being trade and services.

Poso is crossed by Trans-Sulawesi National Highway and served by Kasiguncu Airport, linking it to other cities in Sulawesi such as Palu and Makassar.

Geography

Climate 
Poso has a tropical rainforest climate (Af) with heavy rainfall year-round.

Tourism and culture 
Poso can be reached by plane from Palu or by bus from many other big cities on Sulawesi, and is situated on the equator. It features tropical rain forest, seashore gardens and other natural scenery. Sintuwu Maroso Square is the main town square and located in central Poso. Rumah Katu Marine Park is the water park located 10 km from the center of Poso.

Modero is a well known traditional dance which is performed during celebration of rice harvesting (Padungku), usually in the evenings.

See also
 2002 Poso bus attacks
 2005 Indonesian beheadings of Christian girls

References

Sources

Books

Journals

Reports

Websites 

 
 
 
 
 
 
 

Populated places in Central Sulawesi
Regency seats of Central Sulawesi